The Nandi Awards are presented annually in Andhra Pradesh, for Telugu cinema by the state government. "Nandi" means "bull", the awards being named after the big granite bull at Lepakshi — a cultural and historical symbol of Andhra Pradesh. Nandi Awards are presented in four categories: Gold, Silver, Bronze, and Copper.

2005 Nandi Awards Winners List

References

2005
2005 Indian film awards